Torske is a village in Kramatorsk Raion (district) in Donetsk Oblast of eastern Ukraine, at about  north by east (NbE) from the centre of Donetsk city, at about  east by north (EbN) of Lyman, on the eastern border of Zarichne. It belongs to Lyman urban hromada, one of the hromadas of Ukraine.

The settlement came under attack by Russian forces during the Russian invasion of Ukraine in 2022, was regained by Ukrainian forces by the beginning of October, lost again about a week later, and was attacked on several occasions by Russian forces in December the same year.

References

Villages in Kramatorsk Raion